The Battle of Limonest (20 March 1814) saw 30,000-53,000 Austrian and Hessian troops led by Prince Frederick of Hessen-Homburg defeat 20,000-23,000 French troops under Marshal Pierre Augereau.

Background
While Napoleon faced the main Allied armies of Karl Philipp, Prince of Schwarzenberg and Gebhard Leberecht von Blücher to the east of Paris, a secondary campaign was conducted near Lyon to the south. In January 1814 the Austrians easily captured large swaths of territory, but failed to seize Lyon. By mid-February, a reinforced Augereau managed to recapture some towns, posing a threat. Anxious for his supply line back to Germany, Schwarzenberg sent Prince Hessen-Homburg large forces to protect his southern flank.

Battle
After some stiff fighting, the Allies forced the outnumbered French defenders to withdraw from a line of hills north of Lyon in this War of the Sixth Coalition action.

Aftermath
Lyon, in 1814 the second largest city in France, was abandoned to the Allies as a direct result of the defeat. With greatly superior forces, Hessen-Homburg pressed the French back in a series of battles and captured Lyon on 22 March.

Notes

References

External links
 

Battles of the War of the Sixth Coalition
Battles of the Napoleonic Wars
Battles involving Austria
Battles involving France
Battles involving Hesse-Kassel
Conflicts in 1814
March 1814 events
1814 in France